The Armed Forces of Malta is the name given to the combined armed services of Malta. The AFM is a brigade sized organisation consisting of a headquarters and three separate battalions, with minimal air and naval forces. Since Malta is the guardian of the European Union's most southerly border, the AFM has an active role in border control.

History 
In April 1800, while the blockade of Valletta was underway, Thomas Graham raised the first official Maltese Troops in the British Army, which became known as the Maltese Light Infantry. This battalion was disbanded in 1802 and succeeded by the Maltese Provincial Battalions, the Malta Coast Artillery and the Maltese Veterans. In 1815, Lieutenant Colonel Count Francis Rivarola was entrusted with the task of raising the Royal Malta Fencible Regiment following the disbandment of the Provincials, Veterans and Coast Artillery. The Royal Malta Fencible Regiment was converted to an artillery regiment in 1861 and became known as the Royal Malta Fencible Artillery. Twenty-eight years later, the direct predecessors of the modern Armed Forces of Malta came into existence following the formation of the Royal Malta Artillery on 23 March 1889.

The King's Own Malta Regiment was a territorial infantry regiment on the British Army colonial list. It was formed in 1801 as the "Regiment of Maltese Militia", existing only until the following year. It was reformed as the "Maltese Militia" by Sir Adrian Dingli in 1852 before being disbanded again in 1857. It was raised again, this time as the "Royal Malta Regiment of Militia" in 1889; this regiment was considered to be the successor to the "Maltese Chasseurs" of the early 19th century. The regiment was renamed the "King's Own Royal Malta Regiment of Militia" in 1903 and was disbanded in 1921. The regiment was raised for a fourth time in 1931 as the "King's Own Malta Regiment". Initially on the British Establishment, in 1951 it was transferred to the Malta Territorial Force before becoming part of the Malta Land Force on Malta's independence in 1964. The regiment was disbanded in 1972.

The AFM was formed upon Malta becoming a republic in 1974, when 1 Regiment Royal Malta Artillery was renamed as 1 Regiment, AFM. This initially continued the artillery role, with 2 Regiment formed as an engineers unit. In 1980, 1 Regiment became a mixed unit, with infantry, aircraft and maritime responsibilities, the artillery element being transferred to 2 Regiment. In 1992, there was a major re-organisation, which led to the formation of 3 Regiment and the current structure.

 KOMR Battle Honours

 1800 (awarded for services of the Maltese Chasseurs)
 1882 (Egypt)
 Second World War: Malta 1940–1942

Organisation

Headquarters, AFM 
HQ AFM is the Force Headquarters located at Luqa Barracks, Luqa. It is a joint Headquarters that operates at the military strategic as well as the operational and tactical levels.

HQ AFM is composed of the following branches:

 Human Resources Management Branch
 International Affairs Branch
 Operations, Plans and Intelligence Branch
 Integrated Logistics Branch
 Capabilities and Training Branch
 Financial Management Branch
 Property Management & Development Branch

1st Regiment, AFM 

1st Battalion is Malta's infantry unit, and has primary responsibility for the territorial defence of the country. It is divided into three rifle companies, a support company and a headquarters company.

 Headquarters Company – provides combat service support to the other manoeuvre subunits of the unit. The orbat consists of a Company Headquarters (CHQ), Motor Transport section, Pioneer section, Regimental Police section, Signals section, Armoury section and Quartermaster Section.
 A Company – is responsible for airport security in the controlled access role by providing security guards at terminal access points/airfield perimeter gates leading to restricted areas and by conducting patrol in these said areas. They also enforce access passes and visitor movement control assisted with CCTV surveillance and is based at Malta International Airport.
 B Company – is responsible for security duties in various locations. It carries out land patrols and conducts vehicle checkpoints for traffic contraventions, illegal immigrants' identification and apprehension, and anti-narcotics' searches. It liaises very closely with the police in relation to many of their activities. In addition, it is an internal security company, tasked with guarding high-profile/sensitive government establishments, and is based at Ħal Far.
C Company – is the AFM's Quick Reaction Force, for high-risk operations both internally and as part of the European Union. It also serves as an infantry training unit for the AFM and is based at Ħal Far.
 Air Defence & Support Company – provides Malta's primary air defence capability, armed with the Bofors 40mm L70 (currently being phased out) and ZPU-4 14.5mm AAMG as well as 81mm mortars, Type 69 RPGs and Browning .50 HMGs for ground support. Its primary role is the light anti-aircraft defence of Luqa Airport and other vulnerable points on the Maltese islands. Gunnery training and battery shooting practices are regularly held at Pembroke Ranges, St. Andrews. This sub-unit runs a training school conducting Junior Non-commissioned Officers Leadership development courses, Infantry trade courses, Ceremonial Saluting guns courses and AAMG courses. All the AFM ceremonial activities that involve the firing of the saluting guns are performed by this sub-unit. This sub-unit is also responsible for the administration and training of the Emergency Volunteer Reserve Force.
 Battle Honours
 Anglo-Egyptian War
 Operation Atalanta
 EUTM Somalia

3rd Regiment, AFM 

3 Battalion is the AFM's main support unit, and consists of three operational sections.

 Engineer Squadron – this provides the engineering support.
 Ammunition and Explosives Company – is responsible for the storage and control of all types of ammunition held by the AFM as well as for the storage and control of blasting material used by civilian contractors for quarry blasting, etc. It includes the Explosive Ordnance Disposal (EOD) section which is responsible for the detection and disposal of bombs and other explosive devices. It is also responsible for the inspection of mail at major post offices, inspection of baggage and aircraft at the airport and security checks at the house of Representative
 Electrical and Mechanical Engineering Squadron – is responsible for the repair and maintenance of all AFM vehicles, generators, plant and other service equipment.

4th Regiment, AFM 

Established with the AFM review of 30 October 2006, it includes:
 HQ Company
 Armed Forces of Malta Ceremonial Drill Team – Since its re-establishment on 1 August 2014, the AFM Ceremonial Drill Team has performed synchronized drill displays in different events in events connected with the AFM. The team is platoon sized and is composed of 21 soldiers from different units within the AFM.
 The AFM Band – Established in 1970, the AFM Band takes part in official engagements, performing at ceremonial parades, band displays and other band programmes in Malta and Gozo. Besides their duties as bandsmen, the personnel also perform all military duties.
 Revenue Security Corps – assists Government in the prevention of smuggling, the protection of revenue and, when necessary, the investigation of contraventions relating to fiscal and monetary laws. The RSC is also responsible for the security and cash escort duties of commercial banks.
 C2S Company – responsible for the entire communication of the Armed Forces of Malta. Operates the operation center for S&R, internal & external communications, landlines, & IT services. 
 Training School – Training and Development. Initial training (BMT & Cadetship) and career development (JNCO's & SNCO's).

Air Wing of the Armed Forces of Malta 

The Air Wing of the Armed Forces of Malta is the aerial component of the current Maltese military. The Air Wing has responsibility for the security of Maltese airspace, conducts maritime patrol and search and rescue duties, and provides military assistance to other government departments of Malta. The Air Wing is based at Malta International Airport.

Maritime Squadron 

The Maritime Squadron of the Armed Forces of Malta is the naval component of the current Maltese military. The Maritime Squadron has responsibility for the security of Maltese territorial waters, maritime surveillance and law enforcement, as well as search and rescue. It is based at Hay Wharf (Xatt it-Tiben) in Floriana. It currently operates 10 patrol vessels and 6 other boats.

Volunteer Reserve Force 
In addition to the regular forces, there is also the Volunteer Reserve Force, which consists of part-time volunteers to support the regulars.

Italian Military Mission Malta 
The presence of the Italian Military Mission (IMM) in Malta has taken form in the shape of technical assistance spread over three periods of time; firstly, between 1973 and 1979, then between 1981 and July 1988, and lastly from July 1988 to 7 November 2016, when its last helicopter left Malta.

IMM personnel resources in Malta totalled 12 officers and 35 NCOs from the three service branches of the Italian Armed Forces. It was also equipped with two AB 212 helicopters, 15 heavy plant vehicles, 60 light all-purpose utility vehicles, radio telecommunications, and weapons.

Personnel 

The Armed Forces of Malta mainly consist of professional soldiers. There are also a small number of reserve soldiers. Malta does not employ conscription. Volunteers, who want to enlist, need to be citizens of Malta, and between 18–30 years old. In 2017, there were roughly 1,950 active personnel and 180 reservists.

Operations 
Since Malta's entry in the European Union, the AFM has become more engaged in peacekeeping missions. The AFM has participated in 7 overseas operations.

UNIFIL, 2007, 2018–present (Lebanon)

EUMM Georgia, since 2008 (Georgia)
EUNAVFOR Atalanta, since 2008 (Gulf of Aden)
EUBAM Rafah, since 2009 (Gaza–Egypt border)
EUTM Somalia, since 2010 (Somalia)
EUFOR Libya, 2011 (Libya)
EUNAVFOR Med, since 2015 (Mediterranean Sea)
Frontex Joint Operation (JO) NAUTILUS, 2006 (Mediterranean Sea)
Frontex Joint Operation (JO) POSEIDON, since 2007 (Greece)
Frontex Joint Operation (JO), 2013 (Bulgaria)
Frontex Situation Centre, 2018 (Poland)

Maritime Control Operation and Maritime Safety Training with Turkish Armed Forces, July 2020

Equipment 
On land, 1 Regiment is the designated home of the Maltese Infantry with C (Special Duties) Company being at the cutting edge of this unit. The company is being trained and equipped to be able to contribute a platoon for overseas humanitarian and rescue missions attached to an Italian regiment on missions mandated by the UN or the OSCE. Malta has to ensure that the troops are adequately trained and equipped up to Italian army standards for seamless integration within an Italian regiment, able to tackle any foreseeable problems for up to a year. C (Special Duties) Company is also being geared for a quick reaction role, ready for action at a moment's notice should an emergency, such as terrorism, arise.

The kit used by the Maltese foot soldier has changed drastically in recent years. The fiat for change was given to C Company prior to its successful participation in the multi-national Partnership for Peace exercise in 1996. Following Malta's pledge towards the EU's Military Headline Goal in 2000, procurement received another boost.

With funding being a perennial problem, over the years the Force had to rely on varied equipment transferred or financed by several countries. Standardisation was a headache. But matters have improved considerably, especially with regard to light infantry weapons. At one time there were as many as eight different types of pistol and associated ammunition, now there are two, principally the Beretta FS and some Makarov. The army has also bought Heckler and Koch sub-machine guns and, thanks to Chinese assistance, all infantrymen now have their own individual AKM rifle.

The Maltese Infantry soldier is equipped with the latest British Army issue Personal Load Bearing Equipment including both the webbing and bergen as well as the woodland pattern battle dress uniform, Avon S10 respirator and Kevlar ballistic helmet. Protective ballistic vests and night vision goggles are carried when required.

Infantry soldiers have a number of weapons at their disposal including the Kalashnikov AK-47 and AKM rifles, the Heckler and Koch MP-5 sub-machine guns, the Beretta 92 FS pistols, the PKM machine gun, as well as the General Purpose Machine Gun L7A1. Sniper teams are equipped with the Accuracy International sniper rifle while the anti-tank troops embedded within the infantry platoons carry the RPG-7 rocket launcher.

Eight-man sections are deployed either on Land rovers or Iveco VM-90 trucks. The AFM also operates a number of Bedford trucks which, despite their age, still give excellent service. Suffice to say that these trucks were driven in convoys all the way to Kosovo and back three times in 2001 and not one of them broke down. The Explosives Ordnance Disposal Unit is equipped with two remote controlled Explosive Ordnance Disposal Vehicles – robots used to disable a bomb from a safe distance. The first was bought in 1989 and a second, much more sophisticated one, was bought last year.

The Air Defence Battery forms part of 2nd Regiment and operates Bofors 40L/70 anti-aircraft guns and four barrelled ZSU-4 heavy machine guns. The Bofors guns can be operated either manually or electrically and they can be laid on their targets either visually or through radar. The 14.5mm machine guns can only be operated manually but they provide a high rate of fire. Air defence posed particular problems because of the passage of time on the Bofors guns, built in the early 1950s.

Aircraft 
See: AFM aircraft

Maritime patrol vessels 
See: AFM maritime patrol vessels

Vehicles

Weapons

Uniform and personal equipment 

The AFM wears a single cap badge, based on that of the Royal Malta Artillery, which consists of a gun, similar to that worn by the Royal Artillery but without the crown, on top of a Maltese Cross, with the motto "Tutela Bellicæ Virtutis" underneath.

References

External links 

 Armed Forces of Malta
 For Gallantry Special forces and counterterrorism units of the AFM

Military of Malta
Military units and formations established in 1973